The Women's scratch competition at the 2018 UCI Track Cycling World Championships was held on 28 February 2018.

Results
First rider across the line without a net lap loss wins.

References

Women's scratch
UCI Track Cycling World Championships – Women's scratch
UCI